The 1991 Hockey East Men's Ice Hockey Tournament was the 7th Tournament in the history of the conference. It was played between February 27 and March 10, 1991. Quarterfinal games were played at home team campus sites, while the final four games were played at the Boston Garden in Boston, Massachusetts, the home venue of the NHL's Boston Bruins. By winning the tournament, Boston University received the Hockey East's automatic bid to the 1991 NCAA Division I Men's Ice Hockey Tournament.

Format
The tournament featured three rounds of play with each round being a single-elimination game. In the first round, the first and eighth seeds, the second and seventh seeds, the third seed and sixth seeds, and the fourth seed and fifth seeds played with the winners advancing to the semifinals. In the semifinals, the highest and lowest seeds and second highest and second lowest seeds play with the winners advancing to the championship game. The tournament champion receives an automatic bid to the 1991 NCAA Division I Men's Ice Hockey Tournament.

Conference standings
Note: GP = Games played; W = Wins; L = Losses; T = Ties; PTS = Points; GF = Goals For; GA = Goals Against

Bracket

Teams are reseeded after the quarterfinals

Note: * denotes overtime period(s)

Quarterfinals

(1) Boston College vs. (8) Northeastern

(2) Maine vs. (7) Lowell

(3) Boston University vs. (6) Merrimack

(4) Providence vs. (5) New Hampshire

Semifinals

(2) Maine vs. (8) Northeastern

(3) Boston University vs. (4) Providence

Championship

(2) Maine vs. (3) Boston University

Tournament awards

All-Tournament Team
F Sebastian Laplante (Northeastern)
F Shawn McEachern* (Boston University)
F Steve Tepper (Maine)
D Peter Ahola (Boston University)
D Keith Carney (Maine)
G John Bradley (Boston University)
* Tournament MVP(s)

References

External links
Hockey East Online

Hockey East Men's Ice Hockey Tournament
HE tournament